Unbroken is the third studio album by Irish boy band D-Side. The album was released on October 25, 2006 in Japan, and later released via the iTunes Store worldwide on March 3, 2008. The album peaked at number 58 on the Japanese album charts. Two singles were released from the album: the title track, "Unbroken", and "Let Me Be the One" (which serves as a promotional release only; no official music video was recorded for the song).

Background
"No One" was an unreleased track written by Bryan Adams. The album features writing contributions from a number of well-known songwriters, including two songs penned by Steve Mac and Wayne Hector ("Missing You" and "Then You Kissed Me"; the latter of which was an unreleased song by fellow boyband Westlife). The album's title track was also co-written by Phil Thornalley, famous for his work on Natalie Imbruglia's debut "Left of the Middle". The band co-wrote the mid-tempo ballad "Fly" with songwriter Kai McKenzie, who produced several tracks for the album. The original Japanese release includes four tracks omitted from the worldwide digital release, including the Mac-Hector "Then You Kissed Me".

Track listing

Personnel
(Credits adapted from AllMusic and Unbrokens liner notes.)
 Ryan O' Riain - vocalist
 Derek Moran – vocalist
 Shane Creevey – vocalist
 Phil Thornalley - producer

Charts

Release history

References

2006 albums
D-Side albums